The discography of American indie rock band Joywave consists of three studio albums, one remix/compilation album, three extended plays, two mixtapes, and 18 singles.

The band formed in 2010 and began releasing music the following year. They independently released their first mixtape, 77777, on March 14, 2011. Later that year, they released two singles, "Ridge" and "Traveling at the Speed of Light", the latter of which appeared on 77777. They released two more independent releases, the Koda Vista EP on March 27, 2012, and 88888 mixtape on April 15, 2013. Later in 2013, they appeared as a featured artist on the Big Data song "Dangerous", which became a number-one hit on the Billboard Alternative Songs chart and also reached No. 106 on the Hot 100. In the same year, they signed to major label Hollywood Records and founded their own label, Cultco Music, as an imprint of Hollywood. After releasing the EP How Do You Feel? in 2014, they released their debut studio album, How Do You Feel Now?, on April 21, 2015. The album was supported by four singles, all of which entered the Alternative Songs chart. The single "Tongues" also peaked at number 104 on Belgium's Flanders Ultratop chart.

The band released their second studio album, Content, on July 28, 2017. Two of its singles, "It's a Trip!" and "Doubt" entered the Alternative Songs and Rock Airplay charts. Their third studio album, Possession, was released on March 13, 2020. One of its singles, "Obsession", entered the Alternative Songs and Rock Airplay charts.

Albums

Studio albums

Compilation albums

Mixtapes

Extended plays

As Lead

As Featured Artists

Singles

As lead artist

As featured artist

Notes

Music videos

References

Discographies of American artists
Alternative rock discographies
Electronic music discographies